Zouk is a style of Caribbean music and dance. It may also refer to:

Music
 Zouk Machine, an all-female compas or zouk group from Guadeloupe

Places
 Zouk Mikael, municipality in Keserwan District, Mount Lebanon, Lebanon
 Zouk Mosbeh, municipality in Keserwan District, Mount Lebanon, Lebanon

Other
 Brazilian Zouk, a style of Brazilian dance
 Zouk (club), a nightclub in Singapore
 ZoukOut, an annual dance music festival held in Singapore
 Zouk Mosbeh SC, a Lebanese sports club based in Zouk Mosbeh

See also
Zoukpangbeu, a village in western Ivory Coast
Zoukougbeu, a town in west-central Ivory Coast
Zoukougbeu Department, a department of Haut-Sassandra Region in Sassandra-Marahoué District, Ivory Coast